Baron Kindersley, of West Hoathly in the County of Sussex, is a title in the Peerage of the United Kingdom. It was created in 1941 for the businessman Sir Robert Kindersley, chiefly in recognition of his work as President of the National Savings Committee. His second son, the second Baron, was a Brigadier in the Scots Guards.  the title is held by the latter's grandson, the 4th Baron, who succeeded his father in 2013.

Barons Kindersley (1941)
Robert Molesworth Kindersley, 1st Baron Kindersley (1871–1954)
Hugh Kenyon Molesworth Kindersley, 2nd Baron Kindersley (1899–1976)
Robert Hugh Molesworth Kindersley, 3rd Baron Kindersley (1929–2013)
Rupert John Molesworth Kindersley, 4th Baron Kindersley (b. 1955)

The heir apparent is the present holder's son the Hon. Frederick Hugh Molesworth Kindersley (b. 1987)

Notes

References

Kidd, Charles, Williamson, David (editors). Debrett's Peerage and Baronetage (1990 edition). New York: St Martin's Press, 1990, 

Baronies in the Peerage of the United Kingdom
Noble titles created in 1941
Kindersley family